Hypanus is a genus of stingrays in the family Dasyatidae from warmer parts of the East Pacific and Atlantic, including the Caribbean and Gulf of Mexico. The genus was previous regarded as a junior synonym of the genus Dasyatis.

Species
The placement of H. marianae and H. rudis within the genus is provisional, pending more thorough investigation.
Hypanus americanus (Hildebrand & Schroeder, 1928) (Southern stingray)
Hypanus berthalutzae Petean, Naylor & Lima, 2020 (Lutz's stingray)
Hypanus dipterurus (Jordan & Gilbert, 1880) (Diamond stingray)
Hypanus guttatus (Bloch & Schneider, 1801) (Longnose stingray)
Hypanus longus (Garman, 1880) (Longtail stingray)
Hypanus marianae (Gomes, Rosa & Gadig, 2000) (Brazilian large-eyed stingray)
Hypanus rudis (Günther, 1870) (Smalltooth stingray)
Hypanus sabinus (Lesueur, 1824) (Atlantic stingray)
Hypanus say (Lesueur, 1817) (Bluntnose stingray)

References

Dasyatidae
Taxa named by Constantine Samuel Rafinesque